Lane L. Larson was a Democratic member of the Montana Senate, representing District 22 from 2004 to 2008. He served as Majority Whip.

External links
Montana State Senate - Lane Larson official government website
Project Vote Smart - Senator Lane L. Larson (MT) profile
Follow the Money - Lane L Larson
2008 2006 2004 Senate campaign contributions

Democratic Party Montana state senators
1957 births
Living people
Politicians from Seattle
Politicians from Billings, Montana